Elgin High School is a public high school located in Elgin, Texas (USA) and classified as a 5A school by the UIL. It is part of the Elgin Independent School District located in north central Bastrop County and extends westward into Travis County and eastward into Lee County. In 2013, the school was rated "Met Standard" by the Texas Education Agency.

Athletics
The Elgin Wildcats compete in the following sports 

Baseball
Basketball
Cross Country
Football
Golf
Powerlifting
Soccer
Softball
Swimming
Tennis
Track and Field
Volleyball

State Titles
Boys Powerlifting
2022(5A) Abdias Castillo - 242 class 
Boys Powerlifting
2021(5A) Jordan Hood - 308 class 
Boys Cross Country 
2007(3A)
Boys Golf 
1959(1A), 1960(1A)
Girls Powerlifting
2022(5A) Nya Kirk Jones - 259 class 
Girls Track 
1987(3A)

References

External links
Elgin ISD

Schools in Bastrop County, Texas
Public high schools in Texas